Frédéric Antonetti (born 19 August 1961) is a French professional football manager and former player who is the manager of French club RC Strasbourg. He previously managed Bastia, Gamba Osaka, Saint-Étienne, Nice, Rennes and Lille.

Early life
Antonetti was born in Venzolasca, Haute-Corse.

Managerial career

Bastia
Following the end of his career in 1990, Antonetti later began managing his former club, Corsican Division 1 side Bastia on youth level before taking charge of the senior team in 1994. In his four years at the club, he guided them to the Coupe de la Ligue final in 1995, losing 2–0 against Paris Saint-Germain.

Gamba Osaka
In May 1998, Antonetti moved abroad to Japan to become the new manager of J.League side Gamba Osaka. However, due to poor results, he was sacked in June 1999.

Return to Bastia
Antonetti took charge of Bastia as manager for the second time in June 1999, succeeding José Pasqualetti.

Saint-Étienne
On 7 October 2001, Antonetti was revealed as the new manager of Saint-Étienne, penning a three-year deal. When he took over the reins of Les Verts, the club was in Ligue 2. Antonetti led Saint-Étienne to promotion to Ligue 1 in 2004 and helped them reach the semi-finals of the Coupe de la Ligue, where they were knocked out by eventual winners Sochaux with 2–3. He left the club in June 2004, having been in charge for three seasons.

Nice 
In May 2005, Antonetti became the manager of Ligue 1 side Nice. In 2006, he managed Nice to the Coupe de la Ligue final against Nancy, but were defeated 2–1. He left the club at the end of the season in 2009 after four years in charge.

Rennes
On 2 June 2009, Antonetti joined Ligue 1 club Rennes. After four years in charge of the club, he left by mutual consent. Antonetti later said of the club in 2017: “Rennes is like Canada Dry, it has the colour of a large club, but it’s not". He also spoke of his relationship with the club's president saying “With François Pinault, physically, we saw each other twice a year, once at the beginning of the season, another time in the middle, and then he came to the stadium with one or two matches".

Lille
On 22 November 2015, Antonetti was appointed as the manager of Lille in place of Hervé Renard, signing a three-year contract. When he took over, Lille was in 17th place in the Ligue 1 table. His first competitive match was a Ligue 1 away match against Angers on 28 November, which ended in a 2–0 defeat. After struggling during the first three months, Lille finished the season superbly, finishing fifth in Ligue 1 and runners-up in the Coupe de la Ligue final to Paris Saint-Germain after being beaten 2–1 in the 2015–16 season. In August 2016, Antonetti signed an extension to his contract that would tie him to the club until 30 June 2020.

On 22 November 2016, the club announced that they had parted company with Antonetti and that he had agreed to leave "in a friendly manner". Antonetti received a severance payout of approximately €840,000, which was equivalent to seven months of his gross monthly wages of €120,000. At the time of his departure, Lille was languishing in 19th place in the league, second from bottom in the 2016–17 season. They were also eliminated at the first hurdle of the UEFA Europa League in the third qualifying round against Gabala, where they were eliminated 2–1 on aggregate.

Metz
On 24 May 2018, Antonetti was revealed as the new manager of Ligue 2 side Metz, who had just been relegated from Ligue 1. In his first season, he secured promotion back to Ligue 1 following a 2–1 victory over Red Star.

On 18 May 2019, club president Bernard Serin announced that Antonetti would not continue as manager for the 2019–20 season because of personal reasons and was instead handed a role as general manager, with his assistant Vincent Hognon taking over the managerial post.
Antonetti later returned to Metz for the 2020-21 season which saw the club finish 10th. On 22 February 2022, Antonetti was involved in a fight following the full-time whistle with Lille's sporting director Sylvain Armand. Antonetti was later given a ten-match touchline ban over the incident.
On 7 June 2022, Antonetti agreed to step down as Metz manager by mutual consent.

Managerial statistics

Honours
Bastia
Coupe de la Ligue runner-up: 1994–95
UEFA Intertoto Cup: 1997

Saint-Étienne
Ligue 2: 2003–04

Nice
Coupe de la Ligue runner-up: 2005–06

Rennes
Coupe de la Ligue runner-up: 2012–13

Lille
Coupe de la Ligue runner-up: 2015–16

Metz
Ligue 2: 2018–19

References

External links

1961 births
Living people
Sportspeople from Haute-Corse
Footballers from Corsica
French footballers
Association football midfielders
INF Vichy players
SC Bastia players
AS Béziers Hérault (football) players
Le Puy Foot 43 Auvergne players
Ligue 1 players
French football managers
SC Bastia managers
J1 League managers
Gamba Osaka managers
AS Saint-Étienne managers
OGC Nice managers
Stade Rennais F.C. managers
Lille OSC managers
FC Metz managers
Ligue 1 managers
Ligue 2 managers
French expatriate footballers
Expatriate football managers in Japan
French expatriate sportspeople in Japan